The First Japan Arena Tour may refer to:

The First Japan Arena Tour (Girls' Generation), 2011
The First Japan Arena Tour (Shinee), 2012